Akazienweg is an underground station on the Cologne Stadtbahn lines 3 and 4 in Cologne. The station lies on the intersection of Venloer Straße and Akazienweg streets in the district of Ehrenfeld.

The station was opened in 1992 and consists of a mezzanine and one island platform with two rail tracks.

See also 
 List of Cologne KVB stations

References

External links 
 
 station info page 
 

Cologne KVB stations
Ehrenfeld, Cologne
Railway stations in Germany opened in 1992
Cologne-Bonn Stadtbahn stations